James Brown Plays James Brown Today & Yesterday is the tenth studio album by American musician James Brown. The album was released in November 1965, by Smash Records.

Track listing
All tracks composed by James Brown; except where indicated

References

1965 albums
James Brown albums
Albums produced by James Brown
Smash Records albums